is a Japanese light novel series written by Nigojū and illustrated by Umibōzu. Media Factory have published the series since November 2019 under their MF Bunko J imprint. A manga adaptation with art by Mugiko has been serialized in Media Factory's seinen manga magazine Monthly Comic Alive since May 2020. Both the light novel and manga are licensed in North America by Yen Press. An anime television series adaptation by ENGI aired from July to September 2021. A second season has been announced.

Premise
Ever since he was a child, Kimihiko Kimizuka has attracted trouble. According to him, he was born with a condition that naturally attracts him to troublesome situations, such as being forced to join a flash mob while taking a leisurely walk, accidentally stumbling across an underworld transaction between drug dealers, and being at the site of crime scenes often enough to sometimes be considered a suspect.

One particular day in his third year of junior high, he was kidnapped and forced to carry a suitcase onto an international flight; on that flight, he met Siesta, a woman who proclaims herself to be a "legendary detective". Forcefully made into her sidekick, Kimihiko helped her stop the plane from being hijacked, but not before Kimihiko discovered the existence of underworld organizations. After being constantly pestered, Kimihiko agrees to be Siesta's sidekick and for three years, they worked together, finding and solving an innumerable number of cases.

Now in his last year of senior high, Kimihiko is once again confronted by the ghosts of the past as he tries to solve new cases that fall into his lap. He is extremely bothered by the fact that he is called a detective; after all, the detective is already dead.

Characters

An 18-year-old high school student with a talent to attract criminals so that in his past he often witnessed various crimes and was even later questioned by the police as a suspect himself. This talent, which he himself calls a "trouble magnet", apparently also led to his encounter with the master detective Siesta, who wanted to recruit him as her assistant, which he initially refused due to his characteristic of always ending up in unpleasant situations. Author Nigojū initially planned to give him the alias "Kurokage" when creating the series of novels.

A mysterious woman and self-proclaimed "master detective" who owns a musket and seven items with magical abilities. Her motto is to solve criminal cases before they happen. Until her death, Siesta was a member of the Twelve Tuners, an organization of twelve people who want to save the world from chaos. Originally, Siesta was just a minor character in the series. After Nigojūs manuscript won the top prize in the MF Bunko Newcomer Award, she eventually became one of the main characters in the novel series.

An 18-year-old high school student. She has a strong and dominant personality. As a child, she suffered from a heart defect and was forced to stay in the hospital bed because of it. A year before the actual plot began, she received a donor heart from an unknown donor. Originally, according to the author's plans, Nagisa was to become the only main protagonist of the novel series.

A middle school girl who is already a successful idol at the age of 14 and regularly appears in magazines or commercials. She hires Kimihiko and Nagisa to protect her and an heirloom from a thief. Although Yui is the youngest character in the novel series at 14, she is considered the most adult character. Originally, Nigojū planned in his manuscript to put Yui in the role of the detective, but later changed this.

A 17-year-old assassin who was originally set to assassinate Siesta. However, after losing a fight against Siesta, Charlotte began to idolize her. She is half-Japanese and was born in the United States. She becomes an assistant to Fūbi Kase.

Hel was Alicia's alter ego, who now "lives" in Nagisa's body. She was Siesta's archenemy. To save Alicia's life, Siesta sacrificed her own life, but after her death has the ability to take control of Hel's consciousness and suppress her evil side. Hel was known to "devour human hearts".

A senior police officer who has met Kimihiko several times. Because of his talent for being in the wrong place, she is particularly skeptical of him.

A member of the secret organization SPES. He has the ability to transform into a chameleon, hence he name. In he human form he has white hair and purple eyes. In his chameleon form he is much larger, has sharp teeth and takes on a fearsome appearance.

Bat is a former antagonist of the series. He was a member of the secret organization SPES and was behind the plane hijacking, but was confronted by Siesta and Kimihiko and defeated in a fight. Bat is a liar and a coward who only acts on his own whim.

A member of the secret organization SPES and is an android, who also has genes of a Kerberos and a werewolf. He is Hel's guardian. Like Chameleon, he also has the ability to assume another form - that of a werewolf. He is smart, but follows his primitive instincts.

A girl with pink hair, which is tied into two ponytails. She wears a dress that is similar to Alice, the title character from the novel Alice's Adventures in Wonderland by Lewis Carroll.

Production
The idea of The Detective Is Already Dead started from a random sentence the author, Nigojū, thought of one day. The sentence was "Is there a detective on the plane?", and later became the first sentence of the story.

Media

Light novel
The series is written by Nigojū and illustrated by Umibōzu. Media Factory has published eight volumes since November 2019 under their MF Bunko J imprint. It is licensed in North America by Yen Press.

Volume list

Manga
A manga adaptation by Mugiko has been serialized in Media Factory's seinen manga magazine Monthly Comic Alive since May 27, 2020. It has been collected in four tankōbon volumes so far. Yen Press also licensed the manga adaptation. The manga series covers Vol. 1 and Vol. 3 of the novel series.

Volume list

A second manga adaptation by Poni titled  has also been serialized in Monthly Comic Alive since January 27, 2021. It has been collected in four tankōbon volumes. The manga series covers Vol. 2 of the novel series.

Anime
The 12-episode anime television series adaptation was announced on January 20, 2021. The series is animated by ENGI and directed by Manabu Kurihara, with Deko Akao handling the series' scripts, and Yōsuke Itō designing the characters. Yuuyu, Naoki Tani, and Tatsuya Yano composed the series' music. It aired from July 4 to September 19, 2021 on AT-X and other channels, with the first episode airing as a one-hour special. Mary × jon-Yakitory performed the opening theme song,  (lit. "I Am Alive Right Here"), while Kagura Nana performed the ending theme song,  (lit. "Heartbeat"). Funimation licensed the series outside of Asia. Following Sony's acquisition of Crunchyroll, the series was moved to Crunchyroll. Muse Communication licensed the series in South and Southeast Asia, and streams the series on its YouTube channel (has been removed), iQIYI, and Bilibili and aired on Animax Asia.

It was announced that the VTubers Shirakami Fubuki and Natsuiro Matsuri of Hololive will have a cameo in the third episode of the anime. On July 14, 2021, it was announced that the anime would receive a German dub with the first dubbed episode airing on July 18 the same year. On October 2, 2021, Funimation announced that the series would receive an English dub, which premiered the following day.

On July 24, 2022, it was announced that the series would be receiving a second season.

Episode list
The first part of Ep.1, Ep.2 to Ep. 4, Ep. 10, and part of Ep. 11 to Ep. 12 cover the story of Vol.1 of the light novel series. The second part of Ep.1, Ep.5 to Ep.9, and part of Ep. 11 to Ep. 12 cover Vol.2 of the series.

Reception
The light novel series won the 15th MF Bunko J newcomer award in 2019.

The light novel series placed third and first in July and August 2021 respectively on the Oricon monthly light novel chart.

As of July 2022, the series has 1 million copies in circulation.

Explanatory notes

References

External links
  
  
 

2019 Japanese novels
Anime and manga based on light novels
AT-X (TV network) original programming
Crunchyroll anime
ENGI
Fantasy anime and manga
Japanese fantasy novels
Japanese mystery novels
Kadokawa Dwango franchises
Light novels
Media Factory manga
MF Bunko J
Muse Communication
Mystery anime and manga
Romantic comedy anime and manga
Seinen manga
Upcoming anime television series
Yen Press titles